Geno White (born March 10, 1978, in Jacksonville, Florida) is an American former sprinter. As a high school student he won the 200 m at the 1997 Pan American Junior Athletics Championships. He was part of the 4 × 400 m relay team which took gold in the 2001 Summer Universiade. He attended the University of Florida. At the Division I Outdoor Championships he, Daymon Carroll, Bernard Williams, and Aaron Armstrong set the school record for the 4 × 100 m relay.

References

1978 births
Living people
Sportspeople from Jacksonville, Florida
Track and field athletes from Florida
American male sprinters
Florida Gators men's track and field athletes
Universiade medalists in athletics (track and field)
Universiade gold medalists for the United States
Medalists at the 2001 Summer Universiade